Eddington is a village in the civil parish of Hungerford in the West Berkshire district of Berkshire, England. The Eddington estate is owned by businessman Peter Michael and is located north of Eddington village.

History
Eddington Mill is a late 18th century watermill on the Kennet which still has the machinery largely intact. It is a Grade II listed building.

St Saviour's church was built in 1868 and designed by Arthur Blomfield in the Gothic Revival style. The church closed in the mid 1950s. In 1977 it was sold and converted into a private house.

In 1876, two policemen were shot by poachers in Eddington. Their memorial crosses still stand where they fell.

The village wheelwright's shop, Messrs R. Middleton & Sons, closed in 1951. Some of the woodworking tools from the shop including axes, chisels, planes, lathe tools and gouges, were purchased at an auction on 6 April 1951, and are now in the Museum of English Rural Life.

References

Villages in Berkshire
Hungerford